Paul Michelet (23 September 1880 – 20 November 1958) was a Norwegian horse rider. He was born in Halden. He competed at the 1920 Summer Olympics in Antwerp, where he placed fourth in individual jumping. He also competed at the 1928 Summer Olympics.

References

External links

1880 births
1958 deaths
People from Halden
Norwegian male equestrians
Olympic equestrians of Norway
Equestrians at the 1920 Summer Olympics
Equestrians at the 1928 Summer Olympics
Sportspeople from Viken (county)